Eugene (Gene) Milton (born September 28, 1944) is a former American football wide receiver and kick returner. 

Milton was born on September 28, 1944 in Ocala, Florida and attended segregated Howard High School, where he set numerous Florida Interscholastic Athletic Association (the association for negro schools) records, including a 9.4 time in the 100 yard dash. Although this record tied the national high school record set by Jesse Owens, James Jackson, and Trenton Jackson, it was not widely reported He attended Florida A & M University where he excelled both in football and track. 

After graduating from FAMU, he played professional football for the Miami Dolphins. He later coached football at Florida Memorial University, Miami Central High School, Miami Carol City High School, and Miami Park High School.

He was added to the Florida A & M Sports Hall of Fame in 1990 and the Florida Track and Field Hall of Fame in 2016. He played for the Dolphins from 1968 to 1969.

References

1944 births
Living people
American football wide receivers
Florida A&M Rattlers football players
Miami Dolphins players